Glabrene is an isoflavonoid that is found in Glycyrrhiza glabra (licorice). It has estrogenic activity, showing estrogenic effects on breast, vascular, and bone tissue, and hence is a phytoestrogen (IC50 for estrogen receptor binding = 1 μM). It has also been found to act as a tyrosinase inhibitor (IC50 = 3.5 μM) and to inhibit the formation of melanin in melanocytes, and for these reasons, has been suggested as a potential skin-lightening agent.

See also
 Glabridin
 Isoliquiritigenin
 Liquiritigenin

References

Isoflavonoids
Phytoestrogens